Spratton Hall School is a private preparatory school that welcomes girls and boys aged 4–13, located in the village of Spratton, 8 miles outside Northampton, England, on the A5199 Welford Road.

History

Spratton Hall
The main school building was built in the late 1700s on the site of an earlier farmhouse and owned by the Clark family as a private home. It is mainly constructed from limestone from Kingsthorpe.

The school
Ownership of the building passed through several hands until Kenneth C Hunter and his wife Joan bought it and opened it as a boys’ boarding school in 1951 with 20 boys. They chose the deer for the new school's crest. The deer was originated from a tale of Saint Hubertus' vision, Patron Saint of Hunters.

In 1972 the Charitable Trust was established so the school was administered by a board of governors. The Hunters remained with the school until their retirements in 1975 and Mr Bickley became its first Head Master. In 1987 it became a day-only school and turned co-educational nine years later.

Former Heads
1951–1975: Mr and Mrs K C Hunter
1975–1996: Mr Bickley
1996–2005: Dr Robin Barlow
2005–2013: Mr Stephen Player
2013–present: Mr Simon Clarke

Campus and facilities
The present-day campus consists of various buildings surrounding the historic Spratton Hall, now called "Main House", and subsequent buildings were added as the school expanded. The School has  of grounds, including a wooded area designated for use as a "forest school".

Curriculum
Pupils are prepared for entry into a private and public schools, which traditionally admitted pupils at age 13. As such, the curriculum of the prep school section prepares pupils to take the Common Entrance Examination at the end of Year 8.

Notable people
Former pupils are known as "Old Sprattonians".
Michael Ellis, politician
Mark Haddon, author of The Curious Incident of the Dog in the Night-Time
Harry Mallinder, professional rugby player

Former staff
Matt Dawson coached rugby while playing for the Northampton Saints before the sport became professional.
Tenniel Evans taught at the school during a slack period in his performing career.

References

External links 
Official Website
Profile on the Independent Schools Council website
1950's photos of the school — Spratton Local Historical Society archives

Private schools in West Northamptonshire District
Educational institutions established in 1951
1951 establishments in England
Preparatory schools in Northamptonshire